Bally Sports Wisconsin (BSWI) is an American regional sports network owned by Diamond Sports Group, and operates as an affiliate of Bally Sports. Operating as the "Wisconsin" sub-feed of Fox Sports North until 2007, the channel was known as Fox Sports Wisconsin until 2021. It broadcasts regional coverage of sports events throughout the state of Wisconsin, with a focus on professional sports teams based in Milwaukee, namely the Milwaukee Brewers of Major League Baseball and the Milwaukee Bucks of the National Basketball Association. It primarily operates from a studio/office facility in downtown Milwaukee, with secondary offices and production studio/office hub based in downtown Minneapolis, Minnesota.

Bally Sports Wisconsin is available on cable providers throughout Wisconsin, extreme eastern Minnesota, the western Upper Peninsula of Michigan, northwestern Illinois, and Iowa; it is also available nationwide on satellite via DirecTV.

Bally Sports Wisconsin broadcasts 2,600 hours of locally produced programming per year and reaches more than 1.7 million homes.

History

Origins
The first effort to air the Bucks and Brewers on cable, Sportsvue in 1984, was hampered by multiple factors, including dispersed systems and uncabled parts of the state of Wisconsin (including Milwaukee itself), team nadirs for the Bucks and Brewers, and territory invasion by the Chicago Cubs via the distribution of WGN-TV throughout the state. Sportsvue was discontinued at the beginning of 1985 and resulted in the sale of the Bucks to future senator Herb Kohl. In the meantime, the Bucks and Brewers returned to a statewide broadcast network originated by Gaylord Broadcasting's WVTV, and later WCGV-TV, which was hampered by the two teams limiting their schedule to mainly road games.

Wisconsin Sports Network (unrelated to the current-day high school-focused sports publishing operation), a gametime-only network that broadcast Milwaukee Brewers baseball and Milwaukee Bucks basketball games. The channel was owned by Time Warner Cable's Milwaukee franchise and Group W. In 1996, it was taken over by the Minneapolis-based Midwest Sports Channel (MSC), which was owned by CBS (as a result of CBS' 1995 merger with Group W's corporate parent Westinghouse). Shortly afterward, MSC became an affiliate of the fledgling Fox Sports Net in the fall of 1996.

From then on until 2007, Wisconsin was served by one of three regional subfeeds of MSC/FSN North; the other two being a feed for the Twin Cities metropolitan area and a feed for the rest of Minnesota (as well as Iowa, North Dakota and South Dakota). CBS sold the network to News Corporation in 2000, ultimately rebranding as FSN North in April 2001. Despite being well out of the station's market area, MSC's late night encore of WCCO's 10:00 p.m. newscast also aired on the Wisconsin network until the Fox purchase. The network then began maintaining offices at the studios of Fox owned-and-operated station WITI (channel 6, now an affiliate of the network) in the Milwaukee suburb of Brown Deer, along with sharing limited programming with that station.

Wisconsin gets its own channel
FSN North converted the Wisconsin feed into a separate channel, FSN Wisconsin. The channel launched on April 1, 2007, coinciding with the start of the 2007 Milwaukee Brewers season, originating from facilities in Milwaukee. That year it aired 125 Brewers games and 70 Bucks games. Other programming included the Minnesota Wild (NHL), University of Wisconsin athletic events, WIAC events, and WIAA high school sports, including live telecasts of the annual football championships. At launch FSN Wisconsin was available to more than 1.5 million homes and produced nearly 2,600 hours of local programming.

After Fox Television Stations sold WITI to Local TV in 2008, FSN Wisconsin relocated its operations to facilities in downtown Milwaukee. As part of the national rebranding of the Fox Sports Networks in 2012, FSN Wisconsin was rebranded as Fox Sports Wisconsin.

On December 14, 2017, as part of a merger between both companies, The Walt Disney Company announced plans to acquire all 22 regional Fox Sports networks from 21st Century Fox, including Fox Sports Wisconsin. However, on June 27, 2018, the Justice Department ordered their divestment under antitrust grounds, citing Disney's ownership of ESPN. On May 3, 2019, Sinclair Broadcast Group and Entertainment Studios (through their joint venture, Diamond Holdings) bought Fox Sports Networks from The Walt Disney Company for $10.6 billion. The deal closed on August 22, 2019, thus placing Fox Sports Wisconsin in common ownership with the Milwaukee and Green Bay duopolies of WVTV/WVTV-DT2, WLUK-TV/WCWF and Madison Fox affiliate WMSN. On November 17, 2020, Sinclair announced an agreement with casino operator Bally's Corporation to serve as a new naming rights partner for the FSN channels. Sinclair announced the new Bally Sports branding for the channels on January 27, 2021.  On March 31, 2021, coinciding with the 2021 Major League Baseball season, Fox Sports Wisconsin was rebranded as Bally Sports Wisconsin, resulting in 18 other Regional Sports Networks renamed Bally Sports in their respective regions.

In February 2021, the Brewers and Sinclair announced a new contract that gave the Brewers a minority share in the network. The deal is reportedly worth around $34 million per year for four years. The network also originated the official team coverage of the Bucks' 2021 championship parade.

On March 14, 2023, Diamond Sports filed for Chapter 11 Bankruptcy.

Programming
Bally Sports Wisconsin holds the regional cable television rights to Major League Baseball games from the Milwaukee Brewers, NBA games from the Milwaukee Bucks (whose telecasts became exclusive to the network starting with the 2007–08 season) and since 2000, simulcasts most of the NHL games from the Minnesota Wild televised by Bally Sports North (usually through Bally Sports Wisconsin Extra), as well as pre-game, post-game and fan shows for all three teams. In 2018, simulcasts of Major League Soccer's Minnesota United FC matches were added to Fox Sports Wisconsin after Fox Sports North assumed that team's rights.

The channel also carries high school sports competitions sanctioned by the Wisconsin Interscholastic Athletic Association (WIAA) (the girls' and boys' state tournament final rights are held by Allen Media Group's Wisconsin broadcast cluster and a statewide network of broadcast stations, though Bally Sports Wisconsin is allowed to carry replays of the tournament), weekend outdoor sports programming, and many of the national programs distributed by Bally Sports. It also airs NCAA competitions from the Big East Conference, Big Ten Conference and the Wisconsin Intercollegiate Athletic Conference, and a limited schedule of Marquette men's games through a sub-licensing deal with sister network Fox Sports 1 in which some games not of national interest are distributed to their regional sports network partners, CBS Sports Network and the ESPN family of networks as part of the "new" Big East's television contract (Bally Sports Wisconsin acquired the partial rights to Marquette sports events from Time Warner Cable Sports (the now-defunct Spectrum Sports), a regional network available only on Time Warner systems in eastern Wisconsin, which had been carrying the games since 2006 until 2013).

From 2007 to 2011, Bally Sports Wisconsin sub-licensed a package of fifteen Milwaukee Brewers games for broadcast on Milwaukee independent station WMLW-CA (channel 41, now Me-TV owned-and-operated station WBME-CD); the Fox Sports-produced broadcasts aired outside of the Milwaukee market on Bally Sports Wisconsin, while WMLW owner Weigel Broadcasting sold advertising for those telecasts. The deal was discontinued after the 2011 season due to the Brewers wanting a schedule of games entirely in high definition (until a move of WMLW's schedule to a full-power signal in August 2012, this was impossible for them to do, along with multiplexing limitations) and the launch of a secondary feed allowing live coverage of both Brewers and Bucks games, making the team exclusive to the network.

Team and conference coverage
Major League Baseball
 Milwaukee Brewers

NBA
 Milwaukee Bucks

NHL
 Minnesota Wild (through Bally Sports North)

NCAA Division I athletics
 Wisconsin Badgers (via Fox/Big Ten Conference-owned Big Ten Network; BTN game rebroadcasts and coaches shows only)
 Big East, Big 12 and Pac-12 football and basketball (through Fox Sports 1 and ESPN Plus)
 Marquette Golden Eagles men's basketball (limited schedule via sublicensing by Fox Sports 1, holder of Big East Conference television rights)
 WCHA Hockey.

NCAA Division III athletics
 Wisconsin Intercollegiate Athletic Conference

High school athletics
 WIAA Wisconsin State Tournaments (exclusive rights to all but the boys' and girls' basketball championships, whose rights are held by Bally Sports' part owner Allen Media Broadcasting and air over a local broadcast station network; tape-delayed replays air on Bally Sports Wisconsin)

Other services

Bally Sports Wisconsin HD
Bally Sports Wisconsin HD is a 720p high definition simulcast feed of Bally Sports Wisconsin. All Bucks and Brewers games are broadcast in HD, as well as sports and magazine programs distributed nationally by Bally Sports. Depending on the market, Bally Sports Wisconsin Extra is also transmitted in high definition. Since 2012, the HD feed has been downscaled in letterbox on the channel's standard definition feed, as had become standard for all of Fox's cable networks.

Bally Sports Wisconsin Extra
Bally Sports Wisconsin Extra is an overflow feed that launched on April 9, 2012, and is available in both high definition and standard definition on most cable and satellite providers. The channel is mainly used to allow the network to air games that cannot air on Bally Sports Wisconsin due to events with conflicting scheduling – for example, when a Brewers game airs on Bally Sports Wisconsin, a Milwaukee Bucks game scheduled to start during the duration of the game is carried over Bally Sports Wisconsin Extra (this example often occurs from March to April (or as late as June), when the NBA and Major League Baseball (MLB) seasons overlap, although the reverse situation may occur whenever the Bucks are involved in a pre-Conference Final playoff game), along with Wild and Minnesota United games where scheduled. It also carried national college sports rights they held as FSN, such as the lower-interest Big 12 Conference matchups which were usually pre-empted locally, and were of spare interest to Wisconsin viewers.

Bally Sports Wisconsin Extra also airs Minnesota Wild hockey games simulcast from Bally Sports North that can be shown in-market when Bally Sports Wisconsin is airing a game of local interest. Due to blackout restrictions imposed by MLB and the NBA, Minnesota Twins and Timberwolves games are not broadcast on Bally Sports Wisconsin, although games from both teams are cleared to air via Bally Sports North in parts of Wisconsin. Some systems carry the Extra channel on a full-time basis, while others carry it only for game telecasts; non-game Extra programming contains a loop of national Bally Sports Networks programming such as the World Poker Tour.

On-air staff

Current

Milwaukee Bucks telecasts
 Lisa Byington – play-by-play announcer (primary announcer)
 Stephen Bardo - color analyst
 Marques Johnson - color analyst
 Craig Coshun – Bucks Live host
 Stephen Watson – Bucks Live host (mostly for road games)
 Steve Novak – Bucks Live analyst
 Zora Stephenson – sideline reporter & fill-in play-by-play announcer
 Melanie Ricks – fill-in sideline reporter

Milwaukee Brewers telecasts
 Jeff Levering - lead play-by-play announcer
 Brian Anderson –  alternative play-by-play announcer 
 Bill Schroeder – color analyst
 Chris Singleton - alternative color analyst
 Craig Coshun – Brewers Pregame/Postgame host, field reporter, and alternative play-by-play announcer
 Stephen Watson – Brewers Pregame/Postgame host (mostly for road games)
 Sophia Minnaert – field reporter
 Tim Dillard – Brewers Pregame/Postgame analyst
 Vinny Rottino – Brewers Pregame/Postgame analyst

Wisconsin Badgers telecasts
 Matt Lepay – host of syndicated Badger Sports Report, for Wisconsin Badgers athletics

Former
 Davey Nelson – Brewers Live analyst (deceased)
 Jerry Augustine – Brewers Pregame/Postgame analyst (moved to the Milwaukee Brewers Radio Network in 2021)
 Jon McGlocklin - Bucks color analyst
 Telly Hughes – Bucks & Brewers field reporter
 Jim Paschke - Bucks play-by-play announcer
 Katie George – Bucks sideline reporter

References

External links

Fox Sports Networks
Sports in Wisconsin
Television stations in Wisconsin
Television stations in Milwaukee
Television channels and stations established in 2007
2007 establishments in Wisconsin
Companies that filed for Chapter 11 bankruptcy in 2023
Milwaukee Brewers
Milwaukee Bucks
Bally Sports